JA Vichy-Clermont Métropole Basket is a French professional basketball club based in Clermont. The team currently plays in the Pro B, the second highest professional division in France. The club was formed in 2015 after a merger of JA Vichy and Stade Clermontois BA.

Season by season

Notable players

Quinton Hooker (born 1995)
  Arthur Rozenfeld (born 1995), basketball player in the Israeli Basketball Premier League

References

External links
Official website (in French)

Basketball teams in France
Basketball teams established in 2015